The Gallagher Center is a 2,400-seat multi-purpose arena at Niagara University's campus in Lewiston, New York. The structure was initially built in 1949 and substantially renovated in 1999. It is the home court of the Niagara Purple Eagles men's basketball and women's basketball and volleyball teams. 

Originally known as the Niagara University Student Center, it was renamed in honor of John J. "Taps" Gallagher (1905–1982)  on May 23, 1982.  Coach Gallagher guided the Purple Eagles men's team for 31 seasons (1931–1943, 1946–1965), leading the team to 25 winning seasons, including 11 Little Three championships and seven appearances in the National Invitation Tournament when the NIT was the premiere postseason tournament.  At the time of his retirement, he was the 12th winningest coach in college basketball history.

In 2014, the playing surface was named "Layden Court" in honor of former Purple Eagles coach Frank Layden and his wife, Barbara.  Layden coached the Purple Eagles from 1968 to 1976, leading the Purple Eagles to their first NCAA Tournament appearance in 1970.  He then went on to a 23-year coaching career in the NBA, most notably with the Utah Jazz.

Student Center 
The lower level of Gallagher Center houses the Student Center and Campus Activities Office.

Additional offices located in the Gallagher Center include
 Campus Ministry
 NUSGA
 Student Life
 Multicultural and International Student Affairs
 Athletics
 WNIA Radio

See also
 List of NCAA Division I basketball arenas

References

External links 
 Gallagher Center
 Gallagher Center Student Union

College basketball venues in the United States
Sports venues in New York (state)
Indoor arenas in New York (state)
Niagara Purple Eagles
Sports venues in Niagara County, New York
1949 establishments in New York (state)
Sports venues completed in 1949
Basketball venues in New York (state)
College volleyball venues in the United States
Volleyball venues in New York (state)